

Ballast Head is a locality in the Australian state of South Australia located on the north coast of Kangaroo Island overlooking Nepean Bay about  south of the state capital of Adelaide and about  southeast of the municipal seat of Kingscote.

Its boundaries were created in May 2002 for the “long established name” which is derived from a headland on its coastline.  The principal land use within the locality is agriculture.

The locality includes the historic Fish Canning Factory Site and Jacob Seaman's Hut Site Ruins, which are listed on the South Australian Heritage Register.

Ballast Head is located within the federal division of Mayo, the state electoral district of Mawson and the local government area of the Kangaroo Island Council.

See also
Ballast (disambiguation)

References
Notes

Citations

Towns on Kangaroo Island